Ryŏkp'o-guyŏk, or Ryŏkp'o District, is one of the 18 wards (guyŏk) that constitute Pyongyang, North Korea. This is where part of the Goguryeo tombs of Pyongyang can be found.

Administrative divisions
Ryŏkp'o-guyŏk is divided into 7 tong (neighbourhoods) and 6 ri (villages):

 Changjin 1-dong 장진 1동 (將進 1洞)
 Changjin 2-dong 장진 2동 (將進 2洞)
 Nŭnggŭm-dong 능금동
 Seumul-dong 세우물동
 Taehyŏn-dong 대현동 (大峴洞)
 Ryŏkp'o-dong 력포동 (力浦洞)
 Sosin-dong 소신동 (小新洞)
 Ch'udang-ri 추당리 (楸唐里)
 Ryongsal-li 룡산리 (龍山里)
 Ryuhyŏl-li 류현리 (柳絃里)
 Sosamjŏng-ri 소삼정리 (小三亭里)
 Yang'ŭm-ri 양음리 (陽陰里)

References

Districts of Pyongyang